Georg Heinrich Tischbein (1753/55, Marburg - 4 March 1848, Bremen) was a German engraver, etcher, cartographer and engineer from the Tischbein family of artists.

Biography 
His father, Johann (1717-1757), was an engineering professor at the University of Marburg. The painter and set designer, Johann Valentin Tischbein, was his uncle. Christian Wilhelm (1751-1824), his older brother, was a painter, architect and gallery director.

In 1785, he went to Bremen and, from 1789 to 1791, engraved the tables and illustrations for the Schrötersche Mondwerk by Johann Hieronymus Schröter. In 1796, together with the cartographer, he helped create the Murtfeldtsche Karte; the first map of Bremen produced by using triangulation. In 1804, he did a copper engraved map of the Duchy of Oldenburg, based on drawings by the surveyor, Christoph Friedrich Mentz (1765-1832).  
  
In addition to maps, he produced portraits, cityscapes and landscapes.

Sources 
 Herbert Schwarzwälder: Das Große Bremen-Lexikon. , Bremen 2003

External links

1750s births
1848 deaths
German engravers
German etchers
German cartographers
People from Marburg
Georg Heinrich